Halima Xudoyberdiyeva (Cyrillic: Ҳалима Худойбердиева; ; 17 May 1947 – 17 August 2018) was an Uzbek poet whose themes at different times of her career have dealt with Uzbek nationhood and history, liberation movements, and feminism. She was awarded the title People's Poet of Uzbekistan.

Life
Halima Xudoyberdiyeva was born on 17 May 1947 on Taraqqiyot Collective Farm in Boyovut, Sirdaryo, Uzbekistan. In 1972 she graduated from Tashkent State University's Faculty of Journalism. Her first employment was as an editor at Saodat magazine. In 1975–1977 she did advanced graduate study at the Maxim Gorky Literature Institute in Moscow. She went on to become the head of the Yosh Gvardiya department of publications in 1978. From 1984-94 she was the editor-in-chief of Saodat. She served as the first president of the Women's Committee of Uzbekistan from 1991-94.

Critical reception
In 1992 Xudoyberdiyeva was honored with the title People's Poet of Uzbekistan and the Order of the Badge of Honor medal. In 2017, on her 70th birthday, she was awarded the Order of El-Yurt Hurmati (Respect of the Homeland) medal. According to Razia Sultanova, Xudoyberdiyeva's poetry presents "perfect examples" of Central Asian female Sufi poetry.

Works

 Ilk Muhabbat (First Love), 1972
 Oq Olmalar (White Apples), 1973
 Chaman (Flower Garden), 1974
 Suyanch Togʻlarim (My Supporting Mountains), 1976
 Beliye Yabloki (Russian translation of Oq Olmalar), 1977
 Bobo Quyosh (Grandfather Sun), 1977
 Muqaddas Ayol (Sacred Woman), 1987
 Bu Kunlarga Yetganlar Bor (Those Who Have Reached These Days), 1993
 Toʻmarisning Aytgani (The Sayings of Tomyris), 1996

Xudoyberdiyeva's anthology Saylanma (Selection), with a foreword by poet Abdulla Oripov, was published in 2000.

External links
Selection of Halima Xudoyberdiyeva's poems (in Uzbek)
Brief biography and bibliography of Xudoyberdiyeva (in Uzbek)
BBC page on Xudoyberdiyeva (in Uzbek)
An English translation of the poem "Muqaddas Ayol" (Sacred Woman), along with the original Uzbek text

References

1947 births
2018 deaths
Uzbekistani women poets
Uzbek-language literature
Feminist writers
People from Sirdaryo Region
20th-century Uzbekistani poets
21st-century Uzbekistani poets
20th-century women writers
21st-century women writers
National University of Uzbekistan alumni
Maxim Gorky Literature Institute alumni
People's Poets of Uzbekistan